Bifoun is a town located in Moyen-Ogooué province, Gabon. It lies on the intersection between the N1 and N2 roads. The town is split by the N1 road from Libreville.

The road is surrounded by farmlands with agricultural produce including grapefruits, mandarin oranges, as well as ground nuts. Beyond the farmlands lies the rainforest.

The N1 and N2 intersection lies on the south-east of the town. While the N1 goes southwards into Lambaréné, the N2 follows the path to Ndjolé.

References

Populated places in Moyen-Ogooué Province